Ezra Horton (20 August 1861 – 10 July 1939) was an English footballer who played at right-half; he had the nickname "Ironsides". He played for West Bromwich Albion in the FA Cup final in 1886, 1887 and 1888. His younger brother Jack was also a footballer.

Career
Ezra Horton was born in West Bromwich, Staffordshire on 20 August 1861. He attended the Christ Church & Beeches Road Schools and signed for George Salter Works in 1880, before moving on to West Bromwich Albion in the same year. As a footballer Horton was a very sporting player, a largely defensive right—half who was good at heading, strong with his kicking and fearsome in the tackle, hence his nickname of "Ironsides".

He actually played his first game for the West Bromwich Albion at St. George's in September 1882. After making guest appearances for Port Vale in September 1884 and Aston Villa in March and April 1885, he turned professional with Albion in August 1885. Ezra Horton was most notable for his exploits in the FA Cup, in fact, Horton had the distinction of playing in each of the club's first 36 FA Cup ties, including Albion's first ever FA Cup tie, his senior debut against Wednesbury Town in November 1883. He picked up two runners-up medals and one winners medal. In the 1886 final, he was unable to prevent a 2–0 defeat to Blackburn Rovers in a replay at the Racecourse Ground in Derby. He was again on the losing side in the 1887 final, as Aston Villa claimed a 2–0 victory at The Oval. It proved to be third time lucky for Horton, as he helped the "Throstles" to a 2–1 victory over Preston North End at The Oval in the 1888 final.

Horton, playing as a wing-half, made his League debut on 22 September 1888 at Leamington Road, the then home of Blackburn Rovers. West Bromwich Albion were defeated by the home team 6–2. Ezra Horton appeared in eight of the 22 League matches played by West Bromwich Albion during the 1888–89 season. Ezra also played in the FA Cup semi—final against Preston North End on 16 March 1889, Albion losing 1–0.

In all, he appeared in more than 350 matches for West Bromwich Albion across all competitions – including local cup—ties and friendlies – during his nine—years association with the club. He retired from playing football in June 1891, and in 1895 he became a referee and also a hockey international. Note: Ezra's brother John Horton, was also a member of Albion's first XI, and they played together on many occasions.

Career statistics
Source:

Honours
West Bromwich Albion
FA Cup winner: 1888; runner-up: 1886 & 1887

References

1861 births
1939 deaths
Sportspeople from West Bromwich
English footballers
Association football wing halves
West Bromwich Albion F.C. players
Port Vale F.C. players
Aston Villa F.C. players
English Football League players
English football referees
English male field hockey players
FA Cup Final players